Gabriel Sudan (April 14, 1899 – June 22, 1977) was a Romanian mathematician, known for the Sudan function, an important example in the theory of computation, similar to the Ackermann function.

Born in Bucharest, Sudan received his Ph.D. from the University of Göttingen in 1925 for his thesis Über die geordneten Mengen ("On the theory of ordered sets"), supervised by David Hilbert.  He taught at the Polytechnic University of Bucharest from 1941 until his retirement, in 1966. 

Sudan constructed the function that bears his name with the same aim as Wilhelm Ackermann: to solve in the affirmative a problem raised by Hilbert. The Ackermann and Sudan functions  are chronologically the first examples of recursive functions which are not primitive recursive.

Notes

Bibliography

 

 

 

1899 births
1977 deaths
Scientists from Bucharest
University of Göttingen alumni
20th-century Romanian mathematicians
Academic staff of the Politehnica University of Bucharest
Members of the Romanian Academy of Sciences